1969 Presidential Cup was the third edition of the national super cup of Turkish Football Federation. The match was contested between 1968–69 1.Lig champions Galatasaray and 1968–69 Turkish Cup winners Göztepe.

Match details

See also
 1968–69 1.Lig
 1968–69 Turkish Cup

References

1969
Turkish Super Cup
Presidential Cup 1969